The Mayor of Rotorua officiates over the Rotorua Lakes district of New Zealand, which is administered by the Rotorua Lakes Council (RLC), whose seat is in Rotorua. An elected borough council first came together in February 1923; prior to that, the area had effectively been under government control. Rotorua has had 15 mayors as of 2022, and the current mayor is Tania Tapsell.

List of office holders

Members of Parliament
Four mayors have also been Members of Parliament, and all of them represented the Rotorua electorate (the years in brackets give their term in Parliament):
 Cecil Clinkard (1928–1935)
 Alexander Moncur (1935–1943)
 Ray Boord (1954–1960)
 Steve Chadwick (1999–2011)

References

Rotorua
Rotorua